In coding theory, the hexacode is a length 6 linear code of dimension 3 over the Galois field  of 4 elements defined by 

It is a 3-dimensional subspace of the vector space of dimension 6 over 
.
Then  contains 45 codewords of weight 4, 18 codewords of weight 6 and
the zero word. The full automorphism group of the hexacode is 
. The hexacode can be used to describe the Miracle Octad Generator
of R. T. Curtis.

References

Coding theory